Bloodfist IV: Die Trying is a 1992 American action film directed by Paul Ziller and starring Don "The Dragon" Wilson, Cat Sassoon, Jon Agro, Kale Browne, Gary Daniels, Stephen James Carver, and Lenny Citrano. It was written by Rob Kerchner and Paul Ziller. It was released direct-to-video in 1992.

Premise
When Danny unknowingly repossesses the car of a powerful arms merchant, it sets off a chain of violent retaliation. After his friends are killed and his daughter is kidnapped, Danny takes matters into his own hands. It does not matter that the CIA and the FBI are also involved; the Dragon's fire is in his fists.

External links
 

1992 action films
1990s English-language films
Films shot in Los Angeles
Kickboxing films
American martial arts films
Direct-to-video sequel films
American sequel films
American action films
Bloodfist films
1992 martial arts films
1992 films
Films directed by Paul Ziller
1990s American films